TPN may refer to:

Science and Medicine
 Total parenteral nutrition
 Triphosphopyridine nucleotide, the previous name for nicotinamide adenine dinucleotide phosphate (NADP+)
 Task Positive Network, see Dorsal attention network

Organisations
 Towarzystwo Przyjaciół Nauk (Society of Friends of Science) in Warsaw

Other
 Third-party note or Note verbale, a diplomatic document
 Tupinambá language, by ISO 639 code
 Tiputini Airport, Ecuador
 Treaty on the Prohibition of Nuclear Weapons
 "The Promised Neverland" (Manga / Anime Series)